James Earl Clay (September 8, 1935 – January 6, 1995) was an American jazz tenor saxophonist and flutist.

Early life
Clay was born in Dallas, Texas, on September 8, 1935. While in school, Clay played alto saxophone, and then played with local bands from around the age of 17.

Later life and career
Clay moved to California in 1955, where he initially played in jam sessions. He appeared on recordings with Lawrence Marable the following year. Clay then played with freer musicians including Don Cherry, Billy Higgins, and Ornette Coleman, before returning to Dallas in 1958. He joined the military in 1959, and recorded two albums as a leader the following year. 

Back in California, he led a quartet with Roosevelt Wardell, Jimmy Bond, and Frank Butler, but soon returned to Texas. He toured with Lowell Fulson in the early 1960s, and with Ray Charles on and off between 1962 and 1977. A reappearance on a recording led by Cherry in 1988 – Art Deco – led to a short resurgence of interest in Clay's career. He died in Dallas, Texas on January 6, 1995, aged 59.

Playing style
Grove wrote that "Clay's style revealed a bop-oriented approach, reminiscent of an angular Lester Young." Clay in the late 1980s said: "Texas tenors are known for playing in a raunchy, straight-forward manner, with lots of emotion and few frills. I'm a typical example of that style of player."

Discography

As leader
 James Clay Quartet with Lorraine Geller: Lorraine Geller Memorial (1957)
 The Sound of the Wide Open Spaces!!!! (Riverside, 1960) with David Newman, Wynton Kelly, Sam Jones, Art Taylor
 A Double Dose of Soul (Riverside, 1960) with Nat Adderley, Victor Feldman, Gene Harris, Sam Jones, Louis Hayes
 I Let a Song Go Out of My Heart (Verve Records, 1989)
 Cookin' at the Continental  (Antilles, 1992)

As sideman
 Don Cherry: Art Deco (A&M, 1988)
 Hank Crawford: True Blue (Atlantic, 1964)
 Billy Higgins: Bridgework (Contemporary, 1987)
 Lawrence Marable Quartet:  Tenorman (Fresh Sound Rec., 1956) with Sonny Clark
 Red Mitchell: Presenting Red Mitchell (Contemporary, 1957)
 Wes Montgomery: Movin' Along (Riverside, 1960)
 Frank Morgan: Frank Morgan (Gene Norman Presents, 1955)
David "Fathead" Newman: Return to the Wide Open Spaces (Amazing, 1990) with Ellis Marsalis and Cornell Dupree
 Bill Perkins: The Right Chemistry (Jazz Mark, 1987)

References

Further reading
 Richard Cook & Morton, Brian: The Penguin Guide To Jazz on CD, 6th Edition, London, Penguin, 2002 .

1935 births
1995 deaths
Musicians from Dallas
American jazz saxophonists
American male saxophonists
Riverside Records artists
20th-century American saxophonists
Jazz musicians from Texas
20th-century American male musicians
American male jazz musicians